William Edward Macklin (19 May 1860 – 8 August 1947), also known for his Chinese Ma Lin, was a Canadian medical missionary who mainly practiced in China.

Biography 
William Edward Macklin was born in London, Ontario, Canada on 19 May 1860. His grandfather was an Irish-Canadian priest. His father was a merchant. His mother was a devout Christian of French and Irish descent. He had a younger sister named Daisy Macklin.

In 1880 he graduated from the University of Toronto, where he majored in medical science. In January 1886, Macklin was sent by the Foreign Christian Missionary Society and became the first missionary of the church to China. He settled in Nanjing in April of that same year. Later he established three church in Nanjing. He started the Nanking Christian Hospital in 1890 and was completed in 1893, which is the first formal western hospital in Nanjing. The hospital was locally known as "Ma Lin Hospital". He often preached in Chuxian, Hefei and other places in Anhui province. In January 1914, Jinling University acquired the hospital as an affiliated hospital, which was renamed "University Hospital of Nanking". In 1927, he left Nanjing and settled in California, United States, where he died on 8 August 1947.

Personal life 
He married American woman Dorothy Delang in January 1889.

References

Further reading 
 

1860 births
1947 deaths
University of Toronto alumni